Həmənli is a village in the Goranboy Rayon of Azerbaijan.  The village forms part of the municipality of Qaramusalı.

References 

Populated places in Goranboy District